FC2 can refer to:

 FC2 (portal), an Internet content portal, frequently used by people in the Asian region
 FC2: an EEG electrode site according to the 10-20 system
 The nitrile version of the female condom, introduced in 2005
 Fire Controlman Second Class, a rating in the United States Navy
 Fiction Collective Two, an American author-run, not-for-profit publisher of avant-garde, experimental fiction, with the website fc2.org
 Far Cry 2, a video game by Ubisoft